Wagalla Airstrip is an airstrip in the former North Eastern Province of Kenya. It is situated around 12 kilometers west of Wajir. The airstrip was the site of the Wagalla massacre in February 1984.

References

Airports in Kenya